Təzəkənd, Bilasuvar may refer to:
 Təzəkənd (39° 21' N 48° 35' E), Bilasuvar
 Təzəkənd (39° 32' N 48° 24' E), Bilasuvar